Shapka or Šapka (Шапка in Russian, Ukrainian, Bulgarian and Macedonian languages) means a fur cap or a mountain peak in several Slavic languages.

 Russian fur hat, also known as ushanka

Kęstutis Šapka (born 1949), Lithuanian high jumper
Popova Šapka, a peak in Macedonia

See also
 Czapka, a Polish and Belarusian word for a cap, also a name for 19th-century Polish cavalry headgear